Mucuna bracteata is a leguminous plant. It is a nitrogen-regulating plant that is used in agroecosystems operating around certain types of agricultural plant systems including: rubber trees, oil palm, citrus and coconut. M. bracteate is a cover crop which helps to cover and shield the soil from weeds or plants, as well as providing rapid growth for existing agricultural crops, preventing soil erosion, and providing nitrogen fixation.  The Mucuna bracteata crop grows about 10–15 cm/day in conditions similar to those that rubber and palm oil plants thrive in.

Mucuna bracteata grows in a warm and humid ecosystem, at a temperature of about 20-35 degrees Celsius, and consistent annual rainfall. Originating in the North Eastern areas of India, M. bracteata has been introduced into Hevea rubber plantations in India and oil palm plantations in Malaysia. This plant has the potential to increase soil fertility and health through the processes of natural soil fertilization and aeration, furthermore, providing a sustainable water retention level for the soil beyond the current conditions of the rubber and palm oil plantation fields.

Description
Mucuna bracteata has green leaf foliage with leguminous nodules producing fixed nitrogen leading to amino acids. The seed of the legume of the Mucuna bracteata weighs about 90–190 mg each and is black in colour. This seed, as it is a legume, provides health benefits on its own, individually, for direct consumption. The foliage of the plant creates a shade covering over the soil it occupies, having a height of approximately 30–50 cm off the ground. This plant is a creeping type which grows rapidly and controls weed population in planted areas. With a release of leave foliage, the plant provides good mulching and composting properties to the soil surrounding it.

Geography
Mucuna bracteata originates from North India in forest areas of the Tripura State, which is part of Bangladesh and southwest from China. India specifically utilizes this cover crop in Kerala, India, on local rubber plantations to sustain their rubber tree crop with its primary purpose to increase nitrogen levels in the soil, in turn improving soil health and fertility.

Growing conditions
This is a cover crop that grows rapidly, and is a leguminous vine. M. bracteata grows in conditions of high humidity and high temperature of an average of 28 degrees Celsius, with a constant annual rainfall.

Major weeds, pests, and diseases
Mucuna bracteata is a durable seed, but it is susceptible to a few pests.  It is susceptible to insects prior to germination. There are some caterpillar species that infiltrate M. bracteata seeds to feed on the cotyledon within the seed. These problems can be avoided by storing the seeds in areas closed off from any insect access and keeping them away from any moisture.  The plant however, has a high level of phenolic acids allowing M. bracteata to combat most insects and cattle disturbances.

References

bracteata
Fabales of Asia